Asmalı is a village in the Gölhisar District of Burdur Province in Turkey. Its population is 370 (2021). The village to the east is Evciler.

References

Villages in Gölhisar District